DuckTales is an American animated television series produced by Disney Television Animation. The original cartoon series premiered on syndication and on Disney Channel on September 18, 1987 and ran for a total of 100 episodes over four seasons, with its final episode airing on November 28, 1990. Based upon Uncle Scrooge and other Duck universe comic books created by Carl Barks, the show follows Scrooge McDuck, his three grandnephews Huey, Dewey, and Louie, and close friends of the group, on various adventures, most of which either involve seeking out treasure or thwarting the efforts of villains seeking to steal Scrooge's fortune or his Number One Dime.

DuckTales has inspired video games, merchandise, and comic books, along with an animated theatrical spin-off film entitled DuckTales the Movie: Treasure of the Lost Lamp, that was released to theaters across the United States on August 3, 1990. The series is notable for being the first Disney cartoon to be produced for weekday syndication, with its success paving the way for future Disney cartoons, such as Chip 'n Dale: Rescue Rangers and TaleSpin, creating the syndication block The Disney Afternoon. The show's popular theme song was written by Mark Mueller. Also, Launchpad McQuack later returned to appear in another Disney animated series, becoming a main character in Darkwing Duck.

In February 2015, Disney XD announced the revival of the show, with the intention of rebooting the series. The rebooted series premiered on August 12, 2017 and concluded on March 15, 2021.

Premise
When Donald Duck decides to join the US Navy, he enlists his uncle Scrooge McDuck to look after his nephews, Huey, Dewey, and Louie. Although reluctant to do so due to their hyperactivity, along with his continual pursuit of increasing his wealth and maintaining harsh business ethics, he eventually warms up to them upon seeing how smart and resourceful they are and takes them into his manor as well as several adventures. Scrooge McDuck is well known for his characteristic Scottish accent, spats, and top hat. We later learn in the series his family comes from Castle McDuck, and he came to America when he was young learning how to "work smarter not harder". In addition to them, the show features frequent appearances by Gyro Gearloose, an established comic book character, as well as guest appearances by Donald in the first season – this was either a full appearance, or in a cameo scene when Scrooge and his nephews read letters he sends to them, and a few minor appearances by Scrooge's old flame, Glittering Goldie, whose character was adapted from the comic books. The show introduced new characters to the Duck universe; while some were minor including the nanny Mrs. Beakley, whom Scrooge hires to babysit the nephews; Mrs. Beakley's granddaughter Webby; Scrooge's pilot Launchpad McQuack; Doofus Drake, an admirer of Launchpad and a close friend of the nephews; and the McDuck Manor butler, Duckworth. The second season later introduced three new additional characters as part of the show's stories: "caveduck" Bubba Duck and his pet triceratops Tootsie; and Fenton Crackshell, Scrooge's personal accountant who secretly works as a superhero named Gizmoduck.

The show's primary villains consist of those from the comics: Flintheart Glomgold, who seeks to replace Scrooge as the "richest duck in the world"; the Beagle Boys, who seek to rob Scrooge of his fortune and often target his money bin; and Magica De Spell, who seeks to steal his Number One Dime. A few changes were made to these villains – unlike the comics, Flintheart is of Scottish descent and wears a couple of pieces of Scottish attire, including a kilt; Magica, who is Italian in the comics, has an Eastern European accent, always saying "darling" (which shocks Scrooge in an episode when Magica changes into the form of Mrs. Beakly). She has a brother named Poe, who was transformed into a raven; the Beagle Boys have individual personalities and are headed by their mother, Ma Beagle, who sometimes springs them from jail to conduct schemes with her, but always avoids being caught by the police. The animated series also featured a list of minor villains, most of whom sought to either claim Scrooge's wealth or beat him to treasure.

Most of the stories used in the show revolve around one of three common themes – the first focuses on the group's efforts to thwart attempts by various villains to steal Scrooge's fortune or his Number One Dime; the second focuses on a race for treasure; the third focused on specific characters within the show. Although some stories are original or based on Barks' comic book series, others are pastiches on classical stories or legends, including characters based on either fictional or historical persons. DuckTales is well noted for its many references to popular culture, including Shakespeare, Jack the Ripper, Greek mythology, James Bond, Indiana Jones, and Sherlock Holmes. After its first season, the show moved away from globe-trotting stories, with adventures focused mainly within Duckburg.

Cast

 Alan Young as Scrooge McDuck
 Russi Taylor as Huey, Dewey, and Louie Duck and Webby Vanderquack
 Chuck McCann as Duckworth the Butler, Burger Beagle, and Bouncer Beagle
 Terry McGovern as Launchpad McQuack (entire series) and Babyface Beagle (season 1)
 Frank Welker as Bigtime Beagle (entire series), Baggy Beagle (entire series), Poe (season 1), and Bubba (seasons 2–4)
 Hal Smith as Gyro Gearloose and Flintheart Glomgold
 Joan Gerber as Mrs. Bentina Beakley, Glittering Goldie and Additional voices
 Hamilton Camp as Fenton Crackshell/Gizmoduck (seasons 2–4). Additional voices in season 1
 June Foray as Ma Beagle and Magica De Spell
 Peter Cullen as Bankjob Beagle and Admiral Grimitz (season 1)
 Brian Cummings as Doofus Drake and Bugle Beagle (season 1). Additional voices in season 3
 Tony Anselmo as Donald Duck (season 1)

The show also featured a range of additional voice actors who voiced several minor characters, most frequently including the following:

 Susan Blu
 Corey Burton
 Jim Cummings
 Miriam Flynn
 Kathleen Freeman
 Linda Gary

 Richard Libertini
 Tress MacNeille
 Howard Morris
 Alan Oppenheimer
 Rob Paulsen
 Will Ryan

History

Production

Walt Disney Television Animation began production on DuckTales in 1986, intending to have it ready for a premiere in 1987, and its episodes airing within a 4–6 p.m. placement, at a time when more children would be watching television, rather than within a morning timeslot. Seeking to create a cartoon with high quality animation, in comparison with other 1980s cartoons which had much lower budgets, the animation was handled by Wang Film Productions (some 1987 and 1989–1990 episodes only), Cuckoo's Nest Studio, TMS Entertainment (season 1 only), and Burbank Films (1 episode only) having previously been used on two other Disney cartoons in 1985 – The Wuzzles and Disney's Adventures of the Gummi Bears – both of which had demonstrated better quality cartoons on TV than in previous years. Although the Japanese provided them with more available artists for the cartoon, this also increased production costs, due to the currency exchange rates between the yen and the dollar, though Disney intended to invest heavily in its DuckTaless production, with plans to recuperate its money by having it syndicated via its syndication unit, Buena Vista Television, with a 2.5/3.5 syndicator/station ad split. While this was a concept that worked well with live-action TV reruns, it had only ever been used with inexpensive cartoon series in the past that either recycled theatrical shorts from decades past or only featured limited, low-budget animation, and thus had never been attempted with a high quality animated series, with the heavy investment considered a risky move.

Broadcast
The cartoon premiered worldwide between 18–20 September 1987 (the time and date varying between markets), with a television movie special entitled "The Treasure of the Golden Suns", which was later split up into a five-part serial in future reruns. The first season, aired between 1987–88, consisted of 65 episodes, the "magic number" requirement needed for a show to have weekday syndication (five days a week for thirteen weeks). Disney then commissioned three more seasons – the second season (aired between 1988–89) consisted of two television specials entitled "Time Is Money" and "Super DuckTales", with future reruns splitting them into two five-part serials; the third season (aired between 1989–90) consisted of 18 episodes, with it forming an hour-long syndicated block alongside Chip 'n Dale: Rescue Rangers; and the fourth season (aired during late 1990) consisted of seven episodes (including three unaired episodes meant for the previous season), which was used to form a two-hour-long syndicated block called The Disney Afternoon, consisting of DuckTales and three other half-hour cartoons.

The cartoon continued running within The Disney Afternoon until 1992. Following its departure from the Disney Afternoon, DuckTales reruns remained in syndication until 1995. Reruns continued on the Disney Channel from October 1995 to 2000, where it was at first part of a new two-hour programming block called "Block Party" that aired on weekday late afternoons, with it returning to syndication between 1997 and 1999. Reruns were later shown on Toon Disney between 1999 and late 2004.

Legacy
The show proved an immense success for Disney, who decided to commission other cartoons with a similar level of quality, which included Chip 'n Dale: Rescue Rangers, Darkwing Duck, and TaleSpin. In addition, DuckTales also spawned its own feature-length movie, entitled DuckTales the Movie: Treasure of the Lost Lamp, which was released to theaters on August 3, 1990, along with a franchise of merchandising, including toys, comic books and video games, a spin-off series, and eventually a revival in 2017, that rebooted the series. In 1990, the same year the original show ended, Russi Taylor-the voice of regular DuckTales characters Huey, Dewey, Louie, and Webby- obtained more voiceover work outside of Disney when she began providing the voices of some recurring characters on The Simpsons.

Cameos and appearances in other shows and films
Huey, Dewey, and Louie all appeared in the 1990 drug prevention video Cartoon All-Stars to the Rescue.
Darkwing Duck (1991–92): Aside from Launchpad McQuack being a main character on the show and Gizmoduck appearing sporadically, Scrooge's face appears in the episode "Tiff of the Titans", and Flintheart Glomgold, the Beagle Boys, and Magica De Spell make cameo appearances in the episode "In Like Blunt".
Goof Troop (1992–93): In the episode "The Ungoofables", two of the Beagle Boys appear.
Raw Toonage (1992): Scrooge and Launchpad appear as guest stars, and Webby appears in the opening sequence.
Bonkers (1993–94): In the episode "The 29th Page", the Beagle Boys appear.
Aladdin (1994–95): In the episode "The Day the Bird Stood Still", the Genie transforms into Scrooge.
Quack Pack (1996): Aside from Donald, Ludwig, and the nephews being main characters, the episode "Nosy Neighbors" features the Beagle Boys as an attack dummy.
DuckTales (2017): The original design of Webby makes numerous appearances in the background of the rebooted series as a doll, and is used in a gag in "The Other Bin of Scrooge McDuck!" when Magica DeSpell turned reboot's Webby into a doll.
Black Widow (2021): Clips of the DuckTales intro are shown on a TV in the background as young Natasha Romanoff's family are preparing to have dinner and when her father enters the house, and also during the opening credits sequence in which she and other girls are forced to watch it as part of their training.

Episodes

Home media

VHS releases
10 VHS cassettes, containing two episodes each, were released in the United States.

Also, the episode "Ducky Horror Picture Show" was released with the Goof Troop episode "FrankenGoof" on a VHS cassette entitled Monster Bash in 1993.

UK, Australia and New Zealand VHS releases
10 VHS cassettes, each containing two or three episodes, were released in the United Kingdom, Australia and New Zealand.

DVD releases

North America (Region 1)
Walt Disney Studios Home Entertainment has released the complete series on DVD; four volumes have been released in Region 1 featuring all 100 episodes of the series. The first was released on November 8, 2005 (containing episodes 1–27), the second on November 14, 2006 (containing episodes 28–51), and the third volume on November 13, 2007 (containing episodes 52–75). The fourth and final volume was released as a Disney Movie Club exclusive on September 11, 2018 (containing episodes 76–100). The first three volumes were packaged in a box containing 3 slipcases, one for each. The 2013 re-releases of the first three volumes packages the discs into one DVD case.

DuckTales: Destination Adventure!, a DVD compilation release of episodes from the 2017 reboot, contains two episodes from the original series as bonus features: "New Gizmo Kids on the Block" and "Ducky Mountain High". These episodes were available before their inclusion in the Volume 4 release.

The episodes are in the order that they originally aired (except for the five-part serial "Treasure of the Golden Suns", placed at the beginning of Volume 2). None of the DVD sets contain any special features.

International (Region 2)
In the United Kingdom, Disney released one Region 2 volume in 2007, titled DuckTales First Collection. Despite the set being similar to the North American version, the DVD contained only 20 episodes, while having 5 language tracks: English, French, German, Spanish and Italian. Other regional versions were distributed to other countries, but only going up to episode #20. On November 12, 2012, the UK received two further releases of Collection 2 and Collection 3, being a Region version of the 2nd and 3rd volumes from North America. Unlike the first release, these 3-disc sets include a Fastplay mode, and only four language tracks: English, Dutch, German and French, but subtitles have not been added.

There are currently no plans to release the rest of the series, or the seven episodes missing between the first two sets.

Hindi language (Region 2, 4, 5)
In India where Duck Tales was dubbed in Hindi for TV broadcast on Doordarshan and syndication on Star Plus, 60 episodes out of the first 70 episodes from Seasons 1 and 2 were released by Sony DADC India under license from Disney India, on 20 DVD volumes and Video CDs in PAL format. These discs support Region 2, Region 4 and Region 5. However, due to a limited number of copies, they quickly went out of stock. Each DVD contained only 3 episodes. Episodes 08, 10, 11, 22, 23, 24, 36, 55 and 61 are missing from the released set. The remaining episodes starting from episode 70 to 100 ("Super DuckTales" from Season 2, and entire Seasons 3 and 4) are yet to be released in Hindi on DVD.

Video on demand
Season One of DuckTales was released on Amazon Video in 2013 and was free for Amazon Prime members but as of February 28, 2014, DuckTales Season 1 is no longer accessible through Amazon Video or Amazon Prime accounts.

As of December 11, 2015, some episodes from Season 1 have been made available on Netflix in Denmark, Finland, Norway, and Sweden. In Denmark, at least, only 20 episodes from season 1 are available on Netflix. The episodes available do follow the correct airdate order but some episodes are simply missing. For instance, the episodes on Netflix do not include a lot of Season 1 episodes, even though they have indeed been dubbed into Danish. Amongst the episodes missing are the Five-Part Miniseries, "Treasure of the Golden Sun", "Duckman of Aquatraz", and "Top Duck".

The entire series is currently available for purchase on Amazon Instant Video in Germany, with the episodes split into eight different seasons.

iTunes and Amazon Instant Video in the United States currently offer the entire series (except the episode "Sphinx for the Memories") for purchase in SD format, split into six volumes at $9.99 per volume.

The series has been available to stream on Disney+ since its launch on November 12, 2019, however some episodes are out of order and the episodes "Sphinx for the Memories" and "Launchpad's Civil War" are missing.

Music
The series theme song was written by Mark Mueller, an ASCAP award-winning pop music songwriter who also wrote the theme song to Chip 'n Dale Rescue Rangers; Mueller was paid a little over $1000 to write the tune.

Episode musical scores and background cues were written by at least four musicians. The primary and most known composer was Ron Jones, who wrote and conducted orchestral themes for the program. In contrast to how the other composers were creating a "patronizing" and "cute" score for the show, Jones says he composed the music with regard to the audience and its intelligence. "I would not play the score like a kid's show at all. If they went on an adventure I would play it serious like Raiders of the Lost Ark. Jones' score for DuckTales has been praised by fans of the show.

Three other musicians worked on creating incidental music cues for DuckTales. One musician, Stephen Rucker, also was in charge of conducting and composing tracks, much like Jones. The two other musicians, Steve Zuckerman, and Thomas Chase Jones, composed only synthetic cues for the show, and generally kept the tone lighter, as opposed to Jones and Rucker.

In total, there were approximately 85(?) incidental music cues composed for DuckTales. A track was played on different occasions on an episode, appropriate with the current ongoing situation. As of 2019, there has never been an official release of any of the background music on DuckTales.

The DuckTales Theme was sung by Jeff Pescetto. There are four different versions of the theme song. The original version, serving as the show's opening theme, contained one verse, chorus, bridge, and then a chorus. A shorter version of the opening theme was used in The Disney Afternoon lineup with the line, "Everyday they're out there making Duck Tales, woo-ooh", taken out.

A full-length version of the theme song was released on the Disney Afternoon soundtrack, the third volume (which was released in a set with the other two volumes) in The Music of Disney: a Legacy in Song along with the full TaleSpin theme and in the November 2013 release of the Disney Classics collection. Also, it is heard in the end credits of DuckTales: Remastered and is also released on its official soundtrack.

The full version contains a second verse, and it includes a guitar solo, which is performed with a wah-wah pedal to make it sound like duck-like noises. It also has a fadeout ending, unlike the other versions. There is also a rare extended version that was used in the read-along cassettes in 1987. It has a sequence order of verse-chorus-bridge-chorus-instrumental break-chorus.

According to an interview conducted with Jeff Pescetto in 2009, he was originally approached by Mark Mueller to cut a demo version of the theme song for Disney's approval. Although they were impressed with Pescetto's demo, Disney had decided at first to hire pop group The Jets to perform the theme song for broadcast. However, after recording a version with the group, Disney felt that the theme song needed a different vocal style, and instead commissioned Pescetto to perform the theme. After performing on DuckTales, Pescetto would later be asked to sing the vocal themes for Chip 'n Dale Rescue Rangers (composed by Mueller and produced by Alf Clausen), Darkwing Duck (composed by Steve Nelson and Thom Sharp and produced by Steve Tyrell), and for The Disney Afternoon itself. The Jets, meanwhile, later performed a full-length version of the Rescue Rangers theme song in a music video aired on The Disney Channel in 1989.

Reception

Critical reception 
Maximilian Leunig of Collider wrote, "This classic series brought along characters that hadn’t been in much media apart from comic books, notably written by Carl Barks and Don Rosa. Among these were famous villains like Magica De Spell, the Beagle Boys, and Flintheart Glumgold, to allies like Gyro Gearloose and Glittering Goldie. Of course, the show also created beloved partners like Launchpad McQuack, Gizmoduck, and Webby, who all brought fun and adventure to this Disney classic."  Emily Ashby of Common Sense Media rated the show a 4 out of 5 stars, stating, "DuckTales was a huge hit with fans during its four-year run in the '80s and continues to entertain today with quality stories, wild adventures, and classic Disney characters such as Scrooge McDuck and the dynamic trio of Huey, Dewey, and Louie. Because the stories often are set in far-flung places such as Greece, Antarctica, and the Klondike, kids are introduced to basic concepts of geography and diverse world cultures." 

Jeremy Hayes of BuzzFeed ranked DuckTales 2nd in their "Best Cartoons From The '80s" list, saying, "Arguably the greatest Disney cartoon show ever, the animation and voice acting really stand out (from what I've seen of this show). Often considered one of the most underrated cartoons ever, the show ran for four seasons after debuting in September of 1987." In January 2009, IGN listed DuckTales as the 18th best show in the Top 100 Best Animated TV Shows, writing, "This was Disney’s first syndicated animated TV series and it paved the way for other hugely successful shows like TaleSpin and Chip n’ Dale Rescue Rangers. It even created two spin-offs, Darkwing Duck and Quack Pack. Disney made the smart movie of taking classic characters like Scrooge McDuck and Baloo from The Jungle Book and giving them a late ’80s reboot."

Theme song 
The theme song, written by Mark Mueller, has been widely regarded as one of the most memorable for a television program, with Dan Fletcher of Time magazine noting its lasting impact despite being just a children's song: "Some of the lyrics might not make sense to those older than the age of 10 — we're not sure how life in Duckburg is like a hurricane, or exactly what a 'duck blur' is — but the DuckTales song is still awesome." An article from Vanity Fair noted that the song has a tendency to stick in someone's head, a phenomenon known as an earworm. TVLine lists the theme song among the best animated series themes of all time.

Accolades

Theatrical film

DuckTales the Movie: Treasure of the Lost Lamp was released nationwide in the United States on August 3, 1990 by Walt Disney Pictures and Disney MovieToons, Disney TV Animation division and Disney France. The film follows Scrooge McDuck and his nephews as they try to defeat the evil warlock Merlock from taking over the legendary magic lamp.

The film was well-received by critics and audiences, but was considered a financial disappointment by Disney and several planned sequels were abandoned as a result.

Reboot

In February 2015, Disney XD announced a reboot of the original DuckTales TV series. It premiered on August 11, 2017 and ran for three seasons.

In May 2015, Terry McGovern (the original voice of Launchpad McQuack) stated on Facebook that the entire voice cast would be replaced, stating he felt "heartsick" at the news.

Merchandise

Video and computer games

A DuckTales video game was developed by Capcom and released for the Nintendo Entertainment System and Game Boy in 1989. A sequel to the game, DuckTales 2, was released for NES and Game Boy in 1993. A Disney's DuckTales hand-held LCD game from Tiger Electronics was also released in 1990. A DuckTales mobile game was developed by Artefact Games and published by Disney Mobile and released for Mobile Phones on 2011 in Moscow.

A different platform game, DuckTales: The Quest for Gold, was released by Incredible Technologies for computers in 1990. DuckTales: Remastered, an HD remake of Capcom's original game, developed by WayForward Technologies, was released by Disney Interactive for PlayStation Network, Nintendo eShop and Steam on August 13, 2013. It was also released on September 11, 2013 for Xbox Live Arcade. A retail copy for PlayStation 3 was released on August 20, 2013 with a code to download the game and a DuckTales collector pin.

Various DuckTales items appear in the Toy Box of the Disney Infinity franchise. In 1.0, the Money Bin item and Scrooge and Beagle Boy townspeople appear in addition to the "Scrooge's Lucky Dime" power disc. In 2.0, Scrooge's pile of money and a Scrooge portrait are interior items in addition to the iOS-exclusive "Scrooge's Top Hat" power disc. In 3.0, a Launchpad McQuack townsperson was added.

Launchpad was a selectable character for the mobile game titled Disney Snow Sports in 2007.

An app was released by Disney in the late summer/early fall of 2013 called DuckTales: Scrooge's Loot, where the player tries to get Scrooge back his money that was stolen by Flintheart Glomgold, Magica de Spell, and the Beagle Boys.

Scrooge McDuck, Launchpad McQuack, Webby Vanderquack, Magica De Spell, and Gizmoduck appeared in Disney Emoji Blitz.

Scrooge McDuck, Huey, Dewey, Louie, and Webby appear as playable characters as part of a DuckTales collection in the video game Disney Magic Kingdoms.

In 2019, Huey, Dewey, and Louie Duck, Scrooge McDuck, Gizmoduck, Donald Duck, and Launchpad McQuack were added to Disney Heroes: Battle Mode. Magica De Spell was added to the game in January 2020.

Books
DuckTales releasing on the Picture Books from the part of Disney Gold and was Published by Kodansha.

Comic books and trade paperbacks

DuckTales
DuckTales had two series of comic books. The first series was published by Gladstone Publishing and ran for 13 issues from 1988 to 1990, and the second series was published by Disney Comics and ran for 18 issues from 1990 to 1991. Disney also published a children's magazine based on the show, which also featured comic stories, one of which was written by Don Rosa. Subsequent comic stories were also printed in the magazine Disney Adventures from 1990 to 1996.

On August 29, 2007, Gemstone released a trade paperback of Scrooge's Quest and on October 7, 2008, it was followed by The Gold Odyssey; together they collect the majority of the Disney Comics run.

Carl Barks' Greatest DuckTales Stories
On May 24 and July 19, 2006, Gemstone published a two-volume trade paperback, Carl Barks' Greatest DuckTales Stories. The trades contain reprints of stories written by Carl Barks which were specifically adapted into television episodes of DuckTales.

Both volumes start with an introduction and compare the original comic story with its DuckTales episode counterpart. Volume 1 also includes a two-page article delving into details on adapting the show from the comic series.

BOOM! Studios revival
On February 17, 2011, BOOM! Studios announced that a new DuckTales comic series would begin May 2011 under its kaboom! imprint. The series was written by Warren Spector (author of the Epic Mickey videogame) with art by Leonel Castellani and Jose Massaroli. It lasted for 6 issues, with the final two crossing over with Darkwing Duck. The BOOM! Studios comic will be reprinted in IDW Publishing's Disney's Afternoon Giant in October 2018.

Before its updated DuckTales comic book, BOOM Kids (later called Kaboom!) featured internationally produced DuckTales comic book stories never before seen in the US in issues 392–399 of the Uncle Scrooge comic book. These issues, published 2010–2011, were collected into two trade paperback volumes.

International
The success of DuckTales led to the translation of the show into many languages. Featured together with Chip 'n Dale Rescue Rangers in a Sunday morning program titled Walt Disney Presents, the show premiered in the former Soviet Union in 1991, the first American cartoon shown in the region after the Cold War. One year later, Darkwing Duck was also added to this lineup.
However, the show's theme song (written by Mark Mueller and originally sung by Jeff Pescetto) remained in English for several episodes. The first Russian version of the song was replaced midway through the series with an alternate rendition that contained completely different lyrics.

The series screened in New Zealand weekday afternoons on TVNZ. When TV3 started airing in November 1989 they took over the rights to Disney properties previously held by TVNZ, and as a result Ducktales was later repeated on TV3.

The series aired in India on Doordarshan, dubbed in Hindi. The title track for the original series was sung in Hindi by Amit Kumar. The features were dubbed and the episodes have voice cast of Chetan Shasital, Javed Jaffery, Rakshanda Khan and others. In many countries, the theme song was performed by well-known singers (like in Finland, where it was sung by Pave Maijanen).

In Spanish speaking countries of Latin America, the series was called Pato Aventuras (Duck Adventures). Scrooge McDuck is called "Rico McPato" and the nephews were translated as Hugo, Paco, and Luis, keeping the names of the translated vintage cartoons and comic books. In Spain, while the Latin American dub was used for the first broadcast, a high-quality local dub was produced afterward, keeping the local "Gilito/Juanito/Jaimito/Jorgito" names for the characters. In Brazil, the series was called "Duck Tales: os Caçadores de Aventuras" (Duck Tales: the Adventure Hunters).

In Italy, the series was called Avventure di paperi.

In France, the series was called La bande à Picsou (McDuck's gang). The French name of Scrooge McDuck is Balthazar Picsou. Scrooge's last name Picsou comes from a French expression Pique-Sou emphasizing Scrooge's stingy behavior. Huey, Dewey, and Louie are called Fifi, Riri and Loulou.

In Hungary, the term "DuckTales generation" (Kacsamesék generáció) refers to the people who were born in the early to mid-1980s, because the death of József Antall, the first democratically elected Prime Minister of Hungary, was announced during a DuckTales episode in 1993. This was the generation's first encounter with politics.

In Romania, the series was called Povești cu Mac-Mac (Stories with Mac-Mac). Only the episodes 1–65 were dubbed and aired. Scrooge McDuck was dubbed by a well-known actor, Gheorghe Dinică, until his death (only 5 episodes remained after his death). After Gheorghe Dinică's death, Valentin Uritescu dubbed Scrooge (episodes 50, 57, 60, 64, 65). Also, Angela Filipescu provided the voices of Huey, Dewey, and Louie, Tamara Buciuceanu-Botez provides the voice of Ms. Beakley, Mihaela Mitrache was Webbigail along with the great master Cornel Vulpe as Duckworth. The series was broadcast on Prima TV and first aired on TVR1 in 1994 and the dubbing studio who provide the Romanian version is Ager Film. The intro song was performed by a winner from Mamaia Festival, Alin Cibian.

in Iran, this series was broadcast on IRIB Pooya & Nahal from 2018 to 2019 then the 2017 reboot was broadcast on IRIB Pooya & Nahal in 2019 after The DuckTales 1987 series was broadcast in iran.

In the Philippines, the series was broadcast on GMA Network from 1988 to 1993.

In Uzbekistan, the series was called O'rdaklar sarguzashti (Ducks Adventures).

References

External links

 
 
 

 
1980s American animated television series
1987 American television series debuts
1988 comics debuts
1990 American television series endings
1990s American animated television series
ABC Kids (TV programming block)
American children's animated action television series
American children's animated adventure television series
American children's animated comedy television series
American children's animated fantasy television series
Yeti in fiction
Genies in television
Gladstone Publishing titles
The Disney Afternoon
Disney Channel original programming
Disney Comics titles
Disney comics titles
Donald Duck television series
First-run syndicated television programs in the United States
Television shows based on comics
Animated television series about ducks
Animated television series about families
Animated television series about brothers
Television series by Disney Television Animation
Tiger Electronics handheld games
Treasure hunt television series
English-language television shows
1990s American animated comedy television series
Television shows adapted into comics
Television shows adapted into films
Television shows adapted into video games
Television series created by Jymn Magon